National Secondary Route 169, or just Route 169 (or ) is a National Road Route of Costa Rica, located in the Alajuela province.

Description
In Alajuela province the route covers San Ramón canton (San Ramón, San Isidro districts), Palmares canton (Buenos Aires, La Granja districts).

References

Highways in Costa Rica